is a former Japanese football player. He played for the J2 League club Thespa Kusatsu in 2005 season.

Playing career
He played for the newly promoted J2 League club Thespa Kusatsu in the 2005 season. On October 22, he debuted as a substitute forward against Shonan Bellmare. Although he played three matches, Thespa finished in last place in the 2005 season. He left Thespa at the end of the 2005 season.

Club statistics

References

External links

J. League

1985 births
Living people
Association football people from Shizuoka Prefecture
Japanese footballers
J2 League players
Thespakusatsu Gunma players
Association football forwards